Al-Adiliyah Madrasa is a 13th-century madrasah located in Damascus, Syria.

Modern day
In 1919 CE, the National Museum was assembled inside this school. It holds now the Arabic Language Academy in Damascus.

See also

 Az-Zahiriyah Library
 Nur al-Din Madrasa

References

Religious buildings and structures completed in 1215
Ayyubid architecture in Syria
Mausoleums in Syria
Buildings and structures inside the walled city of Damascus
Madrasas in Damascus
13th-century establishments in the Ayyubid Sultanate
13th-century madrasas